The Museum of Nevis History is a museum in Charlestown, Saint Thomas Lowland Parish, Saint Kitts and Nevis.

History
The museum building was originally built around 1680. It was the birthplace of Alexander Hamilton. In 1840, the building was destroyed during an earthquake.
The building underwent restoration in 1983.

Architecture
The museum is a two-story building. The ground floor houses the museum and the upper floor houses the Nevis Island Assembly.

See also
 List of museums in Saint Kitts and Nevis
 Nevis Historical and Conservation Society

References

Buildings and structures in Nevis
Museums in Saint Kitts and Nevis